The Lost Princess is a children's picture book by Celeste and Carmel Buckingham, published on October 1, 2007 on Divis-Slovakia. Accompanied with illustrations by Georgina Soar, the work credited to the two artists has been released as their official debut. The fairy tale includes such literary genres as fantasy, adventure novels and mystery fiction. The main story itself revolves around friendship, love and family determination. As such, the work is notable due to its resemblance with a novel of the similar title, The Lost Princess of Oz (1917), written by the American author L. Frank Baum for the Oz series.

Background 
Before beginning their musical career, which later became a subject of a significance for the older sister, Celeste, they had created together a fairy tale, which served as their first exposure to the public. However primarily based in Slovakia since 1999, their literary output was to be written in their native English as a result of their father, Thomas Buckingham, who is a native-born citizen of the United States. The official release of their work was eventually accompanied with illustrations by Georgina Soar, while published on October 1, 2007, by Divis-Slovakia. Although neither of the artists pursued their one-off interest in this genre, the Buckinghams continued in creative writing even later, yet solely by means of pop lyrics and in addition to their own music. Some of their further results appeared on the Celeste's debut album, Don't Look Back (2012), issued on EMI Czech Republic.

Inspiration
The plot of the book in some ways bears a resemblance to the 11th canonical "Oz" book, The Lost Princess of Oz (1917), originally invented by L. Frank Baum.

Reception

Editorial reviews
The editorial review of the work printed on the back cover, it described the child authors as "sisters who were eleven and nine when they wrote this book. Both are Americans but live with their parents in the Slovak Republic. Celeste attends middle school [Forel International School] and loves dancing, swimming, music and reading. Carmel is in the fifth grade and loves fairy-tales and reading."

Others 
On October 7, 2007, following the book's original issue as a paperback edition, Thomas A. Buckingham contributed with his own short summary. For the Amazon.com online bookstore web, their father wrote: "This fairy tale was written by 2 sisters aged 11 and 8. The story is about the kidnapping of the younger of 2 sisters and how the older sister is able to find her and bring her back to her family. The characters have many adventures and go thru [sic] many difficulties before their family is reunited. The characters must grow and become stronger thru [sic] these difficulties. This story will appeal to all children."

See also 
 Fantasy literature
 List of Oz books

References 
General

Specific

External links 
'Divis-Slovakia' (official website)

Books by Celeste Buckingham
Books by Carmel Buckingham
Children's fantasy novels
2007 children's books
2007 novels
Slovak picture books